Gabinete Electrónico Consultivo, S.A. (which translates to Electronic Consultative Cabinet), but is trademarked and better known as Gaelco, S.A., is a Spanish company that develops and publishes arcade games and video games. As of 2007, Gaelco develops electronic dart machines under the name of "Gaelco Darts".

List of Gaelco games

For Arcade

For Platforms

Developed

 PC Fútbol 2005 (2004: PC)
 PC Fútbol 2006 (2005: PC)
 PC Fútbol 2007 (2006: PC)

Published

 Radikal Bikers (1999: PlayStation)
 Smashing Drive (2002: Nintendo GameCube & Xbox; 2004/2005: Game Boy Advance)

Compilation Releases

In May 2021 it was announced that a compilation cartridge named "Gaelco Arcade 1" would be released for Evercade featuring Alligator Hunt, Biomechanical Toy, Glass, Snow Board Championship, Thunder Hoop and World Rally.

References

External links
 Gaelco website
 Gaelco Darts website
 Gaelco Darts community
 Gaelco History Recreativas.org (in Spanish)
 Game Producer and Designer Xavi Fradera's website
 Gaelco at MobyGames

Video game development companies
Video game publishers
Video game companies of Spain